Laxmangarh Fort is a ruined old fort on a hill in the town Laxmangarh of Sikar district of Indian state Rajasthan. Situated  from Sikar, it was built by Rao Raja Lakshman Singh of Sikar in 1805, who also founded a village in his own name as Laxmangarh in 1805.

The most imposing building in this Laxmangarh town is its small fortress (owned by the Jhunjhunwala Family) which looms over the well laid out township on its west side. Laxman Singh, the Raja of Sikar, built the fort in the early 19th century after Kan Singh Saledhi besieged the prosperous town. The fort of Laxmangarh is a unique piece of fort architecture in the whole world because the structure is built upon scattered pieces of huge rocks. The nearest thikana is Hameerpura and thakur sahab of Hameerpura was Late Thakur Pal Singh Shekhawat .

In popular culture
 The Laxmangarh Fort is a prominent symbol in Aravind Adiga's debut novel The White Tiger, which won the Man Booker Prize in 2008.

References

External links 

 Laxmangarh Fort at wikimapia

Forts in Rajasthan
Archaeological sites in Rajasthan
Infrastructure completed in 1862
Tourist attractions in Sikar district
1862 establishments in India